The Westin Virginia Beach Town Center is a 38 story high rise hotel and living residence in Virginia Beach Town Center. The 4 star, 236-room hotel occupies the first 15 floors of the building, while the upper stories are residential. Construction began in 2006. Upon completion in 2008, it became the tallest building in Virginia, surpassing the James Monroe Building in Richmond.
 In 2018, the hotel portion of the building was renovated.

See also
CTI Consultants
List of tallest buildings by U.S. state and territory
List of tallest buildings in Virginia

References

External links
 

Residential skyscrapers in Virginia
Virginia Beach Town Center
Skyscraper hotels in Virginia
Buildings and structures in Virginia Beach, Virginia
Hotel buildings completed in 2007
Residential buildings completed in 2007
Buildings and structures completed in 2007
2007 establishments in Virginia